Mustafa Cevahir (born January 5, 1986 in Of-Trabzon, Turkey) is a Turkish football player who last played for Sakaryaspor. He has played a variety of positions for the Fenerbahçe PAF since 2001.

He played 43 times for Fenerbahçe PAF and scored two goals.

External links

1986 births
Living people
Turkish footballers
Fenerbahçe S.K. footballers
İstanbulspor footballers
Karşıyaka S.K. footballers
Yeni Malatyaspor footballers
Association football forwards